FIBA Basketball World Cup records are the records attained throughout the history of the FIBA Basketball World Cup.

General performances

Performances of host countries

From 1959 to 1982, the host qualified directly to the final round, thus bypassing the preliminary round (group stages). As a result, the host's final rank would no worse than the number of teams in the final round (between six and eight); however, from 1986 the host was made to compete in the preliminary round.

However, the success rate of hosts winning the tournament is rather low (14%, 3 of 18), as compared to the FIFA World Cup's success rate of 22% (6 of 21); furthermore, no host has won the championship since Yugoslavia won in 1970, and only one host since then has won any type of medal (Turkey with a silver medal in 2010).

By top four finishes

Most Valuable Players

Top scorer by tournament

Points per game

Total points scored

FIBA Basketball World Cup All-Tournament Team

All-time top cumulative points scorers

All time highest scoring averages

 Player must have played at least 5 games to appear in this statistic

Games with most overtimes

Age records

Oldest

Youngest

*describes age on first day of the tournament

Game score records

Biggest game score

Lowest game score

Biggest margin

Top scorers in a single game

Players with the most tournaments and games played

Top medalists

Players with the most total medals won

All-time team records
*Defunct country
 Source
 update after 2019 World Cup

Notes and references

External links
 
 

Records
Basketball statistics